Richard Tyler  (born ) is a former American actor who appeared in several films and television series. He began his acting career in various theatre plays, such as Tomorrow, the World!. He is reportedly a descendant of former American presidents such as John Tyler and Thomas Jefferson. He played Eddie Breen in the 1945 film The Bells of St. Mary's. His mother, Phyllis Tyler, was an actress. He appeared in other films, including The Spiral Staircase (1946) and Father Was a Fullback (1949). He played the title role of Henry Aldrich in the television series The Aldrich Family. It was his first TV appearance.

Tyler later worked as a bodybuilding writer. Having known Arnold Schwarzenegger since his arrival in the United States in 1968, Tyler was chairman on the California Board of Chiropractic Examiners when Schwarzenegger was the governor of California. He later had to step down from one of the posts due to a controversial firing. In 2004, he published his book called West Coast Bodybuilding Scene: The Golden Era.

Filmography

References

External links

Living people
American male child actors
American male film actors
20th-century American male actors
Year of birth missing (living people)